The 2019 Cavan Intermediate Football Championship was the 55th edition of Cavan GAA's premier Gaelic football tournament for intermediate graded clubs in County Cavan, Ireland. The tournament consists of 15 teams, with the winner representing Cavan in the Ulster Intermediate Club Football Championship.

The championship starts with a league stage and then progresses to a knock out stage.

Laragh United won the championship, beating Belturbet in the final.

Team changes
The following teams have changed division since the 2018 championship season.

To Championship
Promoted from 2018 Cavan Junior Football Championship
  Drumlane  -  (Junior Champions)
Relegated from 2018 Cavan Senior Football Championship
  Ballinagh
 Ramor United also entered a second string into the championship

From Championship
Promoted to 2019 Cavan Senior Football Championship
  Mullahoran  -  (Intermediate Champions)
Relegated to 2019 Cavan Junior Football Championship
  Redhills

League stage
All 15 teams enter the competition at this stage. A random draw determines which teams face each other in each of the four rounds. No team can meet each other twice in the group stage. The top eight teams go into a seeded draw for the Quarter-Finals while the bottom four teams will enter a Relegation Playoff.

Round 1

Round 2

Round 3

Round 4

Round 5

Knock-out stage

Quarter-finals

Semi-finals

Final

Relegation play-offs
The bottom four teams in the league phase will play off against each other. The two winners will maintain their intermediate status for 2019, while the two losers will face off in a relegation final. The ultimate loser will be relegated to the 2020 Junior Championship.

References

External links
 Cavan at ClubGAA
 Official Cavan GAA Website

Cavan GAA Football championships
Cavan Intermediate
Cavan IFC